In non-consequentialist ethical thought, there is a moral distinction between killing and letting die. Whereas killing involves intervention, letting die involves withholding care.

Also in medical ethics there is a moral distinction between euthanasia and letting die. Legally, patients often have a right to reject life-sustaining care, in areas that do not permit euthanasia.

See also 
 Passive euthanasia
 Vacco v. Quill
 Right to die
 Do not resuscitate
 Trolley problem

References

Further reading
 Bennett Jonathan (1993), 'Negation and abstention: two theories of allowing' in B. Steinbock and A. Norcross (eds.), Killing and Letting Die, pp. 230-56, New York: Fordham University Press.

Causes of death
Medical ethics